William Hunden was Archdeacon of Totnes from 1408 until 1415.

References

Archdeacons of Totnes
15th-century English clergy